Jogen Mohan (born 1 November 1963) is an Indian politician from the state of Assam. He is a member of Assam Legislative Assembly who represents the Mahmora constituency. He is the Revenue & Disaster Management, Hills Area Development, Mines & Minerals minister in Himanta Biswa Sarma led-Cabinet. Mohan was also a minister in Sarbananda Sonowal led Government. Mohan is a resident of Jyotipur village in the Sivasagar district of Assam .

References 

Living people
Bharatiya Janata Party politicians from Assam
Assam MLAs 2016–2021
People from Sivasagar district
Assam MLAs 2021–2026
1963 births